Galatasaray may refer to:

 Galatasaray S.K., a Turkish sports club based in Istanbul
 Galatasaray S.K. (football)
 Galatasaray S.K. (men's basketball)
 Galatasaray S.K. (wheelchair basketball)
 Galatasaray S.K. (women's basketball)
 Galatasaray S.K. (Superleague Formula team)
 Galatasaray S.K. (men's volleyball)
 Galatasaray S.K. (women's volleyball)
 Galatasaray High School, a high school in Istanbul which gave its name to the sports club
 Galatasaray University, a university in Istanbul
 Galatasaray Islet, a small island on the Bosphorus
 Galatasaray Museum, the museum of Galatasaray Community
 Galatasaray (district), a district and a square in Istanbul

See also 
 Galatasaray TV, official sports channel of Galatasaray S.K.
 Galatasaray Magazine, official sports magazine of Galatasaray S.K.
 Galatasaray Mobile, official cellular service provider of Galatasaray S.K.
 Galatasaray Store, official store of Galatasaray S.K.
 Galata, a district in Istanbul
 Galata Tower, a medieval tower located in that district
 Galata Bridge, a medieval stone tower in the Galata